Eurysthea latefasciata is a species of beetle in the family Cerambycidae. It was described by Fonseca-Gessner in 1990.

References

Elaphidiini
Beetles described in 1990